Edward Booth may refer to:

Eddie Booth, American Major League Baseball player
Edward Booth (naturalist), founder of the Booth Museum of Natural History
Edward Barlow (priest) (1639–1719), also known as Edward Booth